Project ROSE ("Retrofit of Strike Element") was a program initiated by the Pakistan Air Force (PAF) at their Pakistan Aeronautical Complex for the upgrade of the avionics of its aging  Dassault Mirage III and Mirage 5 fighter jets, which had been built in either France (by Dassault Aviation) or in Australia (by Government Aircraft Factories). The program focused on modernization of military avionics and on-board computer systems of the Mirage III/5, supplied by Pakistani Margella Electronics, French SAGEM and Italian SELEX consortiums, as part of the program.

Conceived in 1992 by the Pakistan Air Force, the program started in 1995 on main considerations of retiring the A–5 Fantan from active service. The Pakistan Air Force, which was already operating Dassault Mirage IIIs and Mirage 5s, began its procurement of second-hand Mirage fighters from Australia, Lebanon, Libya, and Spain at the price range within the MoD's financial capacities. Over 90% of the aircraft were retrofitted at the Pakistan Aeronautical Complex in Kamra; few were upgraded in France. Between 1996 and 2000, several Mirage IIIs and Mirage 5s were bought from other countries and were upgraded under this program at the Pakistan Aeronautical Complex. 

The avionics of the aircraft were improved: some aircraft received the Grifo radar with a detection range of about 75 km. In-flight refuelling probes were added on some aircraft too. Their airframes were overhauled, and their service life was increased. After the ROSE-III upgrade, locally manufactured weapons like the H-2 and H-4 SOW, the Takbir glide bomb, and stealth nuclear cruise missiles such as the Ra'ad Mk-1 and Ra'ad Mk-2, were added to the weapons package of the aircraft. Further considerations for upgrades was recommended but the program was terminated due to the increasing cost of spare parts and the condition of the second-hand airframes at the time of their procurement from various countries.

It is currently expected for all ROSE-upgraded Mirage fighter jets remain in service with the Pakistan Air Force beyond 2020 in specialized tactical attack roles. They are expected to be replaced by the JF–17 Thunder (Block 3 , Block 4 and Block 5) or additional F-16s, or the 5th generation stealth fighter coming out of Project Azm; but there are no publicly confirmed timelines or details about any of these programs.

History

Program overview
 

In the 1990s, the United States placed an economic and military embargo on Pakistan due to its atomic bomb program. During this time, the Indian Air Force began to modernize its fighter aircraft, thus putting stress on the Pakistan Air Force. Furthermore, the United States indefinitely delayed the procurement of F-16 fighter jets, which were already paid for by Pakistan. Restrictions on the Pakistan Air Force caused a great panic in the military, as the PAF was operating American-built infrastructure and the PAF had to come up with innovative solutions to keep all its combat infrastructure operational.

In 1992, the Pakistan Air Force devised a strategy on increasing its self-reliance and immediately launched the ROSE program, as well as Project Sabre II which resulted in the development of the JF-17. It was not until 1995 that Prime Minister Benazir Bhutto released funds to the MoD for both programs. Despite objections from the United States and Prime Minister Benazir Bhutto successfully international lobbying, the PAF ultimately procured Mirage fighters from various countries including Australia, Belgium, Lebanon, Libya, and Spain from 1992 until 2003.

The French SAGEM and Italian SELEX were contracted to provide crucial consultations on military electronics and avionics in 1996. Special overhauling facilities and engineering divisions were established at the Pakistan Aeronautical Complex (PAC) in Kamra. Over 90% of the aircraft were locally retrofitted at the Pakistan Aeronautical Complex, and a few aircraft were upgraded in France. Under this first phase of the program, designated as ROSE–I, around 33 Mirage III fighter jets, designated ROSE I, were upgraded to perform multiple mission types including air superiority and strike missions. The ROSE upgrade also configured the 34 Mirage 5 fighter jets for conducting night operations.

In 1998, SAGEM and SELEX left the program as Margalla Electronics, DESTO, GIDS and NIE joined the program. In ROSE–II, around 20 Mirage fighter jets were upgraded; 14 aircraft were configured in ROSE–III. Newer Mirages bought from Australia and Belgium were in extremely good condition with low flight hours to supplement the PAF's own fleet of 34 Mirage IIIs and 32 Mirage 5s acquired directly from France between 1967 and 1982. The ROSE project was set up to buy as many second-hand aircraft as possible and to upgrade them with the latest avionics and other modern systems. In 1998, the Pakistan Air Force bought the entire fleet of grounded Mirage IIIs from Lebanon and upgraded them indigenously at the Pakistan Aeronautical Complex.

The Pakistan Air Force's project team was formed to manage the program and held review meetings frequently in both Pakistan and France where problems were discussed. The Pakistan Aeronautical Complex and its technical personnel were involved with parts manufacturing and quality control. PAF test pilots validated performance of the new equipment during test flights. In 2003, the PAF bought a total of about 50 grounded Mirage 5 fighter jets from Libya along with 150 engines still in sealed packaging and a huge quantity of spare parts. Most of these aircraft were to be broken up for spare parts required by the Mirage fleet already in PAF service. With this purchase, the PAF was to become the largest operator of Dassault Mirage III/5 fighters in the world.

Mirage IIIO ROSE I

In 1990, the PAF bought 43 Mirage IIIOs and seven Mirage IIIDs, which had been retired from the Royal Australian Air Force between 1987 and 1989. Out of the 50 Dassault Mirage III fighters received from Australia, 40 were found to be suitable for service with the PAF, 12 of them were overhauled at PAC and made operational. After being inspected, the remaining 28 were selected for upgrade under Project ROSE. 28 of the ex-Australian Dassault Mirage IIIO/D aircraft of the PAF were modified to ROSE I standard. The cockpit was modernized with a new head-up display and new multi-function displays, and a new radar altimeter was installed. 

New navigation systems, including an inertial navigation system and a GPS, were also installed. A new radar warning receiver was installed.

The FIAR Grifo M3 multi-mode radar was installed later in a second phase of the upgrade project. It was stated that ROSE I fighters could easily be in service beyond 2010. In early 1999 it was stated that problems in "certain parameters - and errors in certain modes" had surfaced during flight trials of the Grifo M3 radar in the Mirage III, but these were later solved.

A new Italian fire-control radar, the FIAR (now SELEX Galileo) Grifo M3, was installed. The PAF's standard short-range air-to-air missile at the time, the AIM-9L Sidewinder, was integrated with the Grifo M3 radar.

The Grifo M3 was developed specifically to fit the Mirage III and has been in full operation on the Mirage III since 2001. It has a power consumption of 200 W, operates in the X-band and is compatible with infrared-guided, semi-active and active radar guided missiles. The circular antenna has a diameter of 47 cm. The radar has over 30 different operational air-to-air/air-to-surface mission and navigation modes. Air to air modes include Single/Dual Target Track and Track While Scan. Air to surface modes include Real Beam Map, Doppler Beam Sharpening, Sea Low/High, Ground Moving Target Indicator, Ground/Sea Moving Target Track.

Other optional modes include Raid Assessment, Non Cooperative Target Identification, SAR (synthetic aperture radar) and Precision Velocity Update. Low, medium and high pulse repetition frequencies reduce effects of ground clutter. Digital adaptive pulse-compression technology, dual channel receiver, scanning coverage +/-60 degrees in both azimuth and elevation, air cooling, weighs less than 91 kg, MTBF (flight guaranteed) over 220 hours. Extensive ECCM (electronic counter-countermeasures) provisions and built-in test equipment (BITE). IFF interrogators can also be integrated.

 

The PAF is currently installing in-flight refueling probes of South African origin to the upgraded Mirage III ROSE I aircraft, stating that it is a pilot program for the induction of aerial refueling capability into the PAF.

Mirage 5F ROSE II

In 1996, SAGEM sold 44 surplus French Air Force Mirages (35 single-seat Mirage 5Fs and nine dual-seat Mirage IIIBEs) to the PAF. Only 34 Mirage 5Fs and six Mirage IIIBEs were intended to fly again, the others serving as spare parts sources. 20 Mirage 5Fs were overhauled and upgraded in France to ROSE II standards. In total, 29 Mirage 5Fs and six Mirage IIIBEs (respectively designated Mirage 5EF and Mirage IIIDF with the PAF) were delivered to Pakistan by air between 1999 and 2001, with five other aircraft delivered by boat to be overhauled by PAC (one single-seater crashed during an acceptance flight in France).

ROSE II Mirages are similar to ROSE I examples, but they are fitted with a navigation FLIR in place of the Grifo M3 radar. It is mounted in a pod under the nose. Moreover, a new inertial navigation system was installed, together with an encrypted radio.

ROSE III
14 ex-French Air Force aircraft that hadn't been upgraded to ROSE II standards were upgraded to ROSE III standards in Pakistan. In addition to the upgrades embodied in the ROSE II standard, the ROSE III modernization includes a new head-up display, a new multi-function display, and a Chinese-made radar warning receiver. A new PAF squadron was raised on 19 April 2007, No. 27 Tactical Attack "Zarrar" Squadron, to operate the Mirage 5 ROSE III fighters and specialize in night-time surface strike missions.

ROSE IV
A ROSE IV upgrade was also offered, but not taken up. It was based on the ROSE III upgrade standard, but it also included the installation of the Grifo 3 radar, AIM-9L/M capacity, as well as the Dart targeting pod, derived from the Litening. A chaff/flare dispenser and a radar warning receiver were also planned to be added.

Conclusion of the program

The ROSE program was successful and saved Pakistan Air Force's financial capital to be spent in a huge amount on foreign exchange. Under this program, further upgrades were considered and recommendations were made for the procurement of Mirage 2000 from Qatar. 

Acquisitions of Mirage 2000s from Qatar were bypassed by the JS HQ when Indian IAF inducted the jets in its fleet. In 2003, the PAF bought 13 more Mirage IIIEs from Spain for spares cannibalization, and unlike the Australian or Lebanese purchases, that is just what they are being used for. Their condition dictated there was no way that any of them could be returned to service. Problems were encountered for the upgrade of the Mirage 5's role in naval variant for the Navy. However, this was eventually solved with the procurement of spare parts. Because of the program, the PAF gained an international reputation of expertise in maintaining and upgrading the Mirage for both air and naval versions.

Despite challenges and problems, the ROSE program allowed the PAF to gain experience on aircraft technology, and gain confidence to undertake similar projects in the future. The Mirage received new capabilities, thus improving its performance dramatically. At the international level, Pakistan's ingenuity and engineering skills have meant the Mirages continue to play a major part in the defense of Pakistan's airspace.  The program was meant to be continued for some time after 2003, but the Pakistan Air Force had to terminate it due to a combination of high costs and aging Mirage III/5 airframes.

See also
 Pakistan Air Force
 SAGEM
 Dassault Mirage III
 Dassault Mirage 5

References

Notes

Bibliography

External links
 ClubHyper.com article - Ex-RAAF Mirages in Pakistan Air Force service, by Mustafa Aziz
 Jang/Dawn newspaper article - Pakistan buys 50 Mirage jets, spares from Libya

Pakistan Air Force
Military projects
Secret military programs